Acraea lualabae is a butterfly in the family Nymphalidae. It is found in the Democratic Republic of the Congo (Shaba).

Description

In 1912, Harry Eltringham wrote:

Description in Seitz
A. lualabae Neave is very similar to the two following species [A. chaeribula, A. acrita ] ,  scarcely differing except in the forewing having two to four discal dots in cellules 3 to 6. Both wings above orange-yellow with large black 
dots; apical spot of the forewing about 8 mm. in breadth, indicated beneath also; marginal band of the hindwing on both surfaces with large light spots; hindwing above blackish at the base. Congo: Lualaba.

Taxonomy
Acraea lualabae is a member of the Acraea acrita species group. The clade members are:

Acraea lualabae
Acraea acrita
Acraea chaeribula
Acraea eltringhamiana
Acraea guluensis
Acraea manca
Acraea pudorina
Acraea utengulensis

Classification of Acraea by Henning, Henning & Williams, Pierre. J. & Bernaud

Acraea (group acrita) Henning, 1993 
Acraea (Rubraea) Henning & Williams, 2010 
Acraea (Acraea) (subgroup acrita) Pierre & Bernaud, 2013 
Acraea (Acraea)  Groupe egina Pierre & Bernaud, 2014

Etymology
Lualaba is in the Congo.

References

Butterflies described in 1910
lualabae
Endemic fauna of the Democratic Republic of the Congo
Butterflies of Africa